The Compaq Portable was an early portable computer which was one of the first IBM PC compatible systems.  It was Compaq Computer Corporation's first product, to be followed by others in the Compaq Portable series and later Compaq Deskpro series.  It was not simply an 8088-CPU computer that ran a Microsoft DOS as a PC "work-alike", but contained a reverse-engineered BIOS, and a version of MS-DOS that was so similar to IBM's PC DOS that it ran nearly all its application software. The computer was also an early variation on the idea of an "all-in-one". 

It became available two years after the similar, but CP/M-based, Osborne 1 and Kaypro II. Columbia Data Products' MPC 1600 "Multi Personal Computer" had come out in June 1982. Other "work-alikes" included the MS-DOS and 8088-based, but not entirely IBM PC software compatible, Dynalogic Hyperion, Eagle Computer's Eagle 1600 series, including the Eagle Spirit portable, and the Corona personal computer The latter two companies were threatened by IBM for BIOS copyright infringement, and settled out of court, agreeing to re-implement their BIOS. There was also the Seequa Chameleon, which had both 8088 and Z80 CPUs to alternately run MS-DOS or CP/M OSes. Unlike Compaq, many of these companies had previously released computers based on Zilog's Z80 and Digital Research's CP/M operating system. Like Compaq, they recognized the replicability of the IBM PC's off-the-shelf parts, and saw that Microsoft retained the right to license MS-DOS to other companies. Only Compaq was able to fully capitalize on this, by aiming for complete IBM PC and PC DOS software compatibility, while reverse-engineering the BIOS to head off copyright legal claims.

Other contemporary systems include the portable Commodore SX-64, also known as the Executive 64, or VIP-64 in Europe, is a briefcase/suitcase-size "luggable" version of the popular Commodore 64 home computer built with an 8-bit MOS 6510 (6502-based) CPU microprocessor, and the first full-color portable computer. Like the Z80 and "work-alike" portables, its sales fell into insignificance in the face of the Compaq Portable series.

Production and sales
The  Compaq Portable folded up into a luggable case the size of a portable sewing machine.

IBM responded to the Compaq Portable with the IBM Portable PC, developed because its sales force needed a comparable computer to sell against Compaq.

In the second year revenue hit  setting an industry record.

Design 
The Compaq Portable has basically the same hardware as an IBM PC, transplanted into a luggable case (specifically designed to fit as carry-on luggage on an airplane), with Compaq's BIOS instead of IBM's. All Portables shipped with 128 KB of RAM and 1-2 double-sided double-density 360 KB disk drives. Like the non-portable IBM PC, the Compaq Portable runs on power from an AC outlet only; it has no battery.

The machine uses a unique hybrid of the IBM MDA and CGA which supports the latter's graphics modes, but contains both cards' text fonts in ROM. When using the internal monochrome monitor the 9×14 font is used, and the 8×8 one when an external monitor is used (the user switches between internal and external monitors by pressing ). The user can use both IBM video standards, for graphics capabilities and high-resolution text. With a larger external monitor, the graphics hardware is also used in the original Compaq Deskpro desktop computer.

Compaq used a "foam and foil" keyboard from Keytronics, with contact mylar pads that were also featured in the Tandy TRS-80, Apple Lisa 1 and 2, Compaq Deskpro 286 AT, some mainframe terminals, SUN Type 4, and some Wang keyboards. The foam pads the keyboards used to make contact with the circuit board when pressed disintegrate over time, due to both the wear of normal use and natural wear. The CRT display also suffered from a low refresh rate and heavy ghosting.

Software 

Compaq's efforts were possible because IBM had used mostly off-the-shelf parts for the PC and published full technical documentation for it, and because Microsoft had kept the right to license MS-DOS to other computer manufacturers. The only difficulty was the BIOS, because it contained IBM's copyrighted code. Compaq solved this problem by producing a clean room workalike that performed all documented functions of the IBM PC BIOS, but was completely written from scratch.

Although numerous other companies soon also began selling PC compatibles, few matched Compaq's achievement of essentially-complete software compatibility with the IBM PC (typically reaching "95% compatibility" at best) until Phoenix Technologies and others began selling similarly reverse-engineered BIOSs on the open market.

The first Portables used Compaq DOS 1.10, essentially identical to PC DOS 1.10 except for having a standalone BASIC that did not require the IBM PC's ROM Cassette BASIC, but this was superseded in a few months by DOS 2.00 which added hard disk support and other advanced features.

Aside from using DOS 1.x, the initial Portables are similar to the 16 KB – 64 KB models of the IBM PC in that the BIOS was limited to 544 KB of RAM and did not support expansion ROMs, thus making them unable to use EGA/VGA cards, hard disks, or similar hardware. After DOS 2.x and the IBM XT came out, Compaq upgraded the BIOS. Although the Portable was not offered with a factory hard disk, users commonly installed them. Starting in 1984, Compaq began offering a hard disk-equipped version, the Portable Plus, which also featured a single half-height floppy drive. The hard disk offered would be 10 to 21 megabytes, although bad sectors often reduced the space available for use.

In 1985, Compaq introduced the Portable 286, but it was replaced by the more compact Portable II in a redesigned case within a few months. The Portable 286 featured a full height hard disk, and the options of one half-height floppy drive, two half-height floppy drives, or a half-height floppy drive and a tape backup drive.

Reception 
BYTE wrote, after testing a prototype, that the Compaq Portable "looks like a sure winner" because of its portability, cost, and high degree of compatibility with the IBM PC. Its reviewer tested IBM PC DOS, CP/M-86, WordStar, SuperCalc, and several other software packages, and found that all worked except one game. PC Magazine also rated the Compaq Portable very highly for compatibility, reporting that all tested applications ran. It praised the "rugged" hardware design and sharp display, and concluded that it was "certainly worth consideration by anyone seeking to run IBM PC software without an IBM PC".

Successors

Upgrades of Compaq Portable

Compaq Portable Plus 
Released in 1983 upgraded version; The Compaq Portable Plus simply had a hard drive to replace one floppy disk drive, and logos and badges with gold backgrounds instead of silver. Independent computer stores were previously doing this upon request of users, and Compaq saw this as a lost revenue opportunity.

Compaq Portable 286  
The Compaq Portable 286, Compaq's version of the PC AT, was offered in the original Compaq Portable chassis; it was equipped with a 6/8 MHz 286 and a high-speed 20 MB hard drive.

Compaq Portable series 

The Compaq Portable machine was the first of a series of Compaq Portable machines. The Compaq Portable II was smaller and lighter version of Compaq Portable 286; it was less expensive but with limited upgradability and a slower hard drive, The Compaq Portable III, Compaq Portable 386, Compaq Portable 486 and Compaq Portable 486c were later in the series.

References

External links 

 Old Computers - Compaq Portable
 CED in the History of Media Technology - Compaq Portable
 Obsolete Computer Museum - Compaq Portable description
 

Computer-related introductions in 1983